is a Japanese light novel series, written by Shibai Kineko and illustrated by Hisasi. ASCII Media Works have published twenty-one volumes since 2013 under their Dengeki Bunko imprint. A manga adaptation with art by Kazui Ishigami was serialized in ASCII Media Works' seinen manga magazine Dengeki G's Comic from August 30, 2014 to September 29, 2018, and has been collected in eight tankōbon volumes. An anime television series adaptation by Project No.9 aired from April 7, 2016 to June 23, 2016.

Premise
Teenager Hideki Nishimura plays a massively multiplayer online role-playing game called Legendary Age (LA), but one day he proposes online to a girl who tells him she is really a man, so he swears off online marriages. Two years later, he has been involved with a guild and eventually accepts an in-game marriage offer from his persistent guildmate, Ako. When the guild has their first-ever real-life meeting, Hideki is shocked to discover that his teammates are not only all girl gamers, but they also attend his school. The story follows their adventures as they form a school club to play the game while Hideki tries to help Ako, who is infatuated with Hideki as his game character, try to separate fantasy from reality.

Characters

 The viewpoint character of the light novels, Hideki is a first-year high school student who plays Legendary Age (LA), under the name , a male knight. At first, he distrusts girls online after having been rejected by a girl who told him that she was actually a guy in real life. He is Ako's in-game husband in Legendary Age after reluctantly accepting her many repeated in-game proposals. Over the course of the series, Hideki begins to develop real feelings for Ako and attempts to help her differentiate reality from the gaming world. Outside of LA, he used to be an otaku.

 The cover girl of the series, Ako is Hideki's schoolmate who goes by the game name , a female cleric, in LA. She was first Hideki's in-game wife as a result of her repeated in-game proposals to him and his reluctant acceptance. In real life, she attends the same school as Hideki, but was often absent due to her heavy addiction to the online game. She was shy and a loner at school, but is extremely happy to meet Rusian in real life. She had a hard time distinguishing between the gaming world and reality, as she believed she is Hideki's actual wife and will often and casually call her guildmates by their game character names at school. Occasionally, Ako would go into psychotic trances in reaction to non-gaming "normies", saying that they should die. Ironically, despite being a recluse at first, she is the only one of the group that can cook.

A petite twin-tailed blonde classmate, she despised otakus at first and didn't like when Hideki acted like one or tried to interact with her. However, she is actually a gamer herself under the moniker , a male knight (sword dancer). Her character name is German for pig, which she did not know until Kyo informs her offline, much to her chagrin. Although she is popular at school, she had turned down many boys so she can have more gaming time.

 The student council president at Hideki's school and the leader of the Alley Cats guild in LA. She has long dark hair and goes under the character name , a male mage at the beginning of the series. Her guild mates call her Master. She comes from a wealthy family; her father is on the school board, and her family has several companies. She often uses in-game purchases to boost her game attributes, but does not depend on her family's money but on her personal investments to fund it. Outside of the guild, she didn't have any friends as her family didn't give her much chance to socialize. She sponsors the creation of the school's game club.

 Akane's friend who discovers she plays online games, and agrees to keep it a secret. Shortly afterwards, she begins playing LA under the character name , who is a summoner. She has purplish blue hair then pink in the anime.

 Hideki's teacher who watches over him and the girls, and becomes their club's advisor. She gives him advice on how to interact with girls and balance his gaming life. It is later revealed that she was the LA player , a catgirl who rejected Hideki's in-game proposal two years prior, stating that she was actually a guy. She has a large fan following in LA.

Media
The first light novel volume was published on July 10, 2013 by ASCII Media Works under their Dengeki Bunko imprint. As of April 2020, twenty-one volumes have been published.

Light novel

Manga

Anime
Following Sony's acquisition of Crunchyroll, the series was moved to Crunchyroll. Universal Pictures originally announced that they would release the series in the UK. However, it was later revealed that MVM Entertainment would release the series within the region.

Works cited
  "LN" is shortened form for "light novel" and refers to a volume of the And You Thought There Is Never a Girl Online? light novels.
  "Ch." is shortened form for "Chapter" and refers to a chapter number of the And You Thought There Is Never a Girl Online? manga.
  "Ep." is shortened form for "Episode" and refers to an episode number of the And You Thought There Is Never a Girl Online? anime.

Notes

References

External links
  at Dengeki Bunko 
  
  at Funimation
 

2016 anime television series debuts
2013 Japanese novels
Anime and manga based on light novels
ASCII Media Works manga
AT-X (TV network) original programming
Crunchyroll anime
Dengeki Bunko
Kadokawa Dwango franchises
Light novels
NBCUniversal Entertainment Japan
Project No.9
Romantic comedy anime and manga
Seinen manga
Television shows based on light novels